The Armenian Evangelical School of Trad was built in 1936, in a poor area in East Beirut named Trad District. It had kindergarten, and six primary classes.

The last principal was Mrs. Vera Sevadjian.

History
The Armenian Evangelical Social Center School of Trad was built in 1936, in Trad district, which is a poor area in Eastern suburbs of Beirut, Lebanon. It was originally a refugee camp for the Armenians escaping from Turkey because of the massacres in 1915. 
The school was built specifically for disadvantaged children – the generation of the Armenian refugees who, because of their desperate situation, were left without education. Being aware of this situation, a missionary, serving in the Armenian community, Miss Elizabeth Webb, had the vision of founding a center to save these children. So she gathered them and taught them how to read and write.

Later, Miss Webb bought a piece of land and donated it to the Armenian Evangelical Church to be used as a social center. Gradually, the center developed into a school. In 1948 the school had its full elementary classes. 
In 1969, the present building was established.

The school shared its building with the social center, which was available for the children after school hours, where they could study & receive help. The social center also reached the children & the adolescents through spiritual & social activities.

After the school close, due to the loss of students, it has transformed into an Armenian school for children with disabilities, Zvartnots.

See also
Armenian Evangelical Guertmenian School (Ashrafieh, Lebanon)
Armenian Evangelical Peter and Elizabeth Torosian School (Amanos, Lebanon)
Armenian Evangelical Shamlian Tatigian Secondary School (Bourj Hammoud, Lebanon)
Armenian Evangelical Central High School (Ashrafieh, Lebanon)
Yeprem and Martha Philibosian Armenian Evangelical College (Beirut, Lebanon)
Armenian Evangelical Secondary School of Anjar (Anjar, Lebanon)
Haigazian University (Riad El Solh, Beirut, Lebanon)

External links
Educational Council of the Union of the Armenian Evangelical Churches in the Near East (UAECNE)

Schools in Lebanon
Armenian Evangelical schools
Educational institutions established in 1936
1936 establishments in Lebanon
Educational institutions disestablished in 2012
2012 disestablishments in Asia